The Hanover Farm House is a historic home located at Beallsville, Montgomery County, Maryland, United States. This brick house consists of a main block and kitchen wing dating to 1801–1804, and a -story modern kitchen wing added in 1954.

The Hanover Farm House was listed on the National Register of Historic Places in 1980.

References

External links
, including photo in 1974, at Maryland Historical Trust website

Houses completed in 1804
Houses in Montgomery County, Maryland
Houses on the National Register of Historic Places in Maryland
Federal architecture in Maryland
National Register of Historic Places in Montgomery County, Maryland